Polka Floyd is an American band that covers many Pink Floyd songs by using the accordion to introduce polka into the music.  One reviewer commented, "Cutting a vast swath across Pink's entire discography, the band injects the late great classic rock band's music with much-needed fun." The band plays "more than 40 Pink Floyd songs, mostly from 1968 to 1979." The band has shared bills with Unknown Hinson, əkoostik hookah, and The Toasters.  One reviewer has said the band's first album is "like the antidote to angst" and "[f]reak show Floyd for the 21st century, ya gotta love it."

The band was established in 2006. "'We're more of a rock band with a polka edge than a polka band with a rock edge,' said Ken Haas, lead singer and the one who started the band’s sound by accident."

As one reviewer said, "Well this whole thing just kicks ass.  And let me say it again, the guitar works by Ken Haas is remarkable. .... There'll be no more AAAAAAGHHH................but there will be more EE-I EE-I- EE- I- OO."

Personnel
 Ken Haas - lead vocals, guitar
 Chris Zielinski - bass guitar, vocals
 Penny Haas - keyboards
 Frank Dramczyk - drums

Discography

 The Polka Floyd Show (2007)
 Live at the Ohio Theatre (2009)

References

Further reading
Peanuts. "Peanuts Interview - Polka Floyd", "OhioOnline Magazine", 15 October 2009.  Retrieved on 15 October 2009.

External links
 Polka Floyd
 Polka Floyd's MySpace
 Polka Floyd photo gallery at Livingston Daily

Musical groups established in 2006
American polka groups
Pink Floyd